The English women's cricket team toured Australia and New Zealand in January and February 2000. They played Australia women's national cricket team in 4 One Day Internationals and New Zealand in 5 One Day Internationals. They lost both series, losing 4–0 to Australia and 5–0 to New Zealand.

Tour of Australia

Squads

Tour Matches

50-over match: New South Wales v England

50-over match: New South Wales Second XI v England

WODI Series

1st ODI

2nd ODI

3rd ODI

4th ODI

Tour of New Zealand

Squads

Tour Matches

50-over match: Wellington v England

WODI Series

1st ODI

2nd ODI

3rd ODI

4th ODI

5th ODI

References

External links
England Women tour of Australia 1999/00 from Cricinfo
England Women tour of New Zealand 1999/00 from Cricinfo

International cricket competitions in 2000
Australia and New Zealand
Women's international cricket tours of Australia
Women's international cricket tours of New Zealand
2000 in women's cricket